Thitarodes pui is a species of moth of the family Hepialidae. It is found in Tibet, China.

References

Moths described in 2007
Hepialidae
Moths of Asia